A Tribute to Stuff Smith is an album by the American jazz violinist Billy Bang recorded in 1992. The album was released on the Italian Soul Note label and features songs written by or associated with violinist Stuff Smith (1909-1967). Bang is supported by pianist and former Smith collaborator Sun Ra (in a rare sideman appearance), bassist John Ore and drummer Andrew Cyrille.

Reception
The Allmusic review by Scott Yanow awarded the album 4 stars: "Ra was a bit hemmed in by the concept, and his conception of time was different than Bang's, so there is a certain amount of tension in the music. Also, Billy Bang has a much rougher sound and a freer style than Stuff Smith, but the end results are well worth hearing".

Track listing
 "Only Time Will Tell" (Stuff Smith) - 5:33 
 "Satin Doll" (Duke Ellington, Johnny Mercer, Billy Strayhorn) - 8:01 
 "Deep Purple" (Peter DeRose, Mitchell Parish) - 6:24 
 "Bugle Blues" (Smith) - 2:52 
 "A Foggy Day" (George Gershwin, Ira Gershwin) - 3:58 
 "April in Paris" (Vernon Duke, E. Y. Harburg) - 5:18 
 "Lover Man" (Jimmy Davis, Ram Ramirez, James Sherman) - 6:27 
 "Yesterdays" (Otto Harbach, Jerome Kern) - 4:12 
Recorded at Sear Sound in New York City on September 20, 21 & 22, 1992

Personnel
Billy Bang - violin
Sun Ra - piano
John Ore – bass
Andrew Cyrille – drums

References

Black Saint/Soul Note albums
Billy Bang albums
1992 albums